Rear-Admiral Sir Malcolm Murray-Macgregor of Macgregor, 4th Baronet, JP (29 August 1834 – 31 August 1879) was a Scottish baronet and senior Royal Navy officer.

Born on 29 August 1834, Malcolm Murray-Macgregor was the eldest son of Sir John Atholl Bannatyne Murray-Macgregor, 3rd Baronet (1810–1851), who would inherit the title and the chieftaincy of Clan Gregor in 1841, and his wife Mary Charlotte (died 1896), youngest daughter of co-heiress of Rear-Admiral Sir Thomas Masterman Hardy. Among his siblings was Sir Evan Macgregor (1842–1926), a civil servant who was Permanent Secretary to the Admiralty from 1884 to 1907.

Murray-Macgregor succeeded to the baronetcy and the chieftaincy on his father's death on 11 May 1851; Sir John had arrived in the British Virgin Islands less two months earlier to take up his appointment as the colony's president. Meanwhile, Murray-Macgregor had embarked on a career in the Royal Navy; having joined the service in 1847, he was commissioned as a Lieutenant in 1854 and served at Sebastopol (1854–55) during the Crimean War, receiving the Crimean Medal. He was promoted to Commander in 1856 and took command of HMS Harrier in 1858. Four years later, he was promoted to Captain. In 1869, he was awarded a medal by the Royal Humane Society for saving the life of a seaman who had been drowning off the West coast of Africa. In 1875, he was placed on the retired list and in 1878 was promoted to the rank of Rear-Admiral. He was not active politically, but held a number of offices in Perthshire, where he was a magistrate, a commissioner of supply and chairman of the School and Parochial Boards.

Murray-Macgregor died on 31 August 1879 at Edinchip, aged 45; he had been in ill health for 18 months. He was survived by his wife, Lady Helen Laura, daughter of Seymour McDonnell, 4th Earl of Antrim, and by five children: Malvina Charlotte (born 1865), who married Granville William Richard Somerset, son of the 2nd Baron Raglan; Margaret Helen Mary (born 1867); Malcolm (1873–1958), who was a Royal Navy officer and succeeded to the baronetcy; Mariel Alpina (born 1876); and Alexander Ronald (1878–1960). A photograph of Murray-Macgregor by Camille Silvy (1860) is in the National Portrait Gallery's collections (NPG Ax50422).

References 

1834 births
1879 deaths
Baronets in the Baronetage of Great Britain
Scottish clan chiefs
Royal Navy officers
19th-century Scottish businesspeople